This is a survey of the postage stamps and postal history of Slovenia.

Slovenia is a country in Central Europe touching the Alps and bordering the Mediterranean. Slovenia borders Italy on the west, the Adriatic Sea on the southwest, Croatia on the south and east, Hungary on the northeast, and Austria on the north. The capital and largest city of Slovenia is Ljubljana. Slovenia covers an area of 20,271 square kilometres and has a population of over 2 million. The majority of the population speaks Slovene which is also the country's official language. Other local official languages are Hungarian and Italian.

Kingdom in 1918 
Slovenia was part of the Austro-Hungarian Empire until 1918 when it became part of the Kingdom of Serbs, Croats and Slovenes. Stamps were issued specifically for Slovenia, including the well known "chainbreakers" series, until the first stamps for use throughout the kingdom were issued in January 1921. The name of the kingdom was changed to the Kingdom of Yugoslavia in 1929.

World War II 
On 8 July 1941 the Germans annexed parts of Slovenia, as Lower Styria, extending south to the River Sava and German stamps were used.

Ljubljana Province
Italy later occupied the rest of Slovenia as the Province of Lubiana. In September 1943 Italy ended hostilities with the allies and the Germans took over Lubiana, renaming it the Province of Laibach. Stamps were issued by both countries, most of which were overprints on existing stamps.

Post war 
In 1945 Slovenia became part of the federal republic of Yugoslavia and used its stamps until 1991-92.

Independent Slovenia 

The first stamp of independent Slovenia was issued on 26 June 1991. Yugoslav stamps were valid for postage in Slovenia until 25 April 1992.

See also 
Postage stamps and postal history of Yugoslavia

References

Further reading 
 Bačar, Neli and Maša Blaško. Poštna znamka na Slovenskem: raziskovalna naloga: etnologija. Ajdovščina : Osnovna šola Danila Lokarja, 2007
 Čičerov, Stanislav. Slovenija, portovne znamke = Slovenia postage due stamps: 1919-1921. Ljubljana: Masta Trade, 2008 
 Kuhelj, Mirjan. Ljubljanska Pokrajina: Poštni promet v času okupacije od 11.4.1941 do 8.5.1945. Ljubljana: Mobitel, 2004 
 Turk, Ivan and Cicerov, Stanislav. 90 let verigarjev - prvih slovenskih poštnih znamk: zbornik mednarodnega simpozija, Ljubljana, 17.-19. april 2009 = 90th anniversary of the chainbreakers - the first Slovenian postal stamps: proceedings of the International Symposium, Ljubljana, 17–19 April 2009. Ljubljana: Filatelistična zveza Slovenije, 2009 
 Urbanc, Nataša. Slovenija od prve svetovne vojne do koroškega plebiscita in Rapalla: [katalog]. Ljubljana: Muzej novejše zgodovine, 2000 
 Jugopošta Journal of the Yugoslavia Study Group.

External links
 Yugoslavia Study Group

Philately of Yugoslavia
Philately of Slovenia
Postal history of Slovenia